Cattin' Curson is a live album by American trumpeter Ted Curson which was recorded in Paris in 1973 and first released on the French Marge label and on Trident in the United States as (Typical Ted).

Reception

AllMusic awarded the album 3 stars.

Track listing
All compositions by Ted Curson
 "Flatted 5th" - 8:00
 "Marjo" - 6:00
 "Airi Tune" - 8:30
 "Searchin' the Blues" - 9:10
 "Typical Ted (Cattin' Curson)" - 9:30

Personnel
Ted Curson – trumpet, bugle, piccolo trumpet
Chris Woods – alto saxophone, flute
Georges Arvanitas – piano
Jacky Samson – bass 
Charles Saudrais – drums

References

1975 live albums
Marge Records live albums
Trident Records albums
Ted Curson albums